Scythropiodes hamatellus is a moth in the family Lecithoceridae. It was described by Kyu-Tek Park and Chun-Sheng Wu in 1997. It is found in Korea and Sichuan, China.

The wingspan is 17–18 mm. The forewings are creamy white, speckled with brown scales. There is a small dark streak near the base, a costal spot in the middle, two distinct discal spots near the middle and the end of the cell, another small dot near the cell and a large spot near the tornus, as well as a row of dark dots running along the marginal line. There are five to six brown dots along the margin of the termen. The hindwings are grey.

Etymology
The species name is derived from Latin hamatus (meaning hooked).

References

Moths described in 1997
Scythropiodes